Coleophora alecturella is a moth of the family Coleophoridae that is endemic to Tibet, China.

References

External links

alecturella
Endemic fauna of Tibet
Moths of Asia
Moths described in 1989